Daniel Charles Alexander Newton (born 14 December 1990) is an English cricketer.  Newton is a right-handed batsman who bowls right-arm medium pace.  He was born in Westminster, London and educated at Kings School, Wimbledon.

While studying for his degree in Geography at Durham University, Newton made his first-class debut for Durham MCCU against Nottinghamshire in 2010.  In his only first-class match, he batted once and was dismissed for a duck by Ryan Sidebottom.

References

External links
Daniel Newton at ESPNcricinfo
Daniel Newton at CricketArchive

1990 births
Living people
People from Westminster
People educated at King's College School, London
Alumni of Durham University
English cricketers
Durham MCCU cricketers